The men's madison competition at the 2018 Asian Games was held on 31 August at the Jakarta International Velodrome.

Schedule
All times are Western Indonesia Time (UTC+07:00)

Results
Legend
DNF — Did not finish

References

External links
Official website

Track Men Madison